Jeffrey John Arbon (born 1967), is a male former diver who competed for Great Britain and England.

Diving career
Arbon represented Great Britain at the 1988 Summer Olympics.

He represented England in both the springboard and platform events, at the 1986 Commonwealth Games in Edinburgh, Scotland. Four years later he represented England again in both events, at the 1990 Commonwealth Games in Auckland, New Zealand.

He was a member of the Essex Cormorants Diving Club.

References

1967 births
Living people
English male divers
Divers at the 1986 Commonwealth Games
Divers at the 1990 Commonwealth Games
Olympic divers of Great Britain
Divers at the 1988 Summer Olympics
Commonwealth Games competitors for England